Georgess McHargue (June 7, 1941 – July 18, 2011) was an American writer and poet.

Biography

McHargue was born in New York City. After working at Golden Press, she became an editor at Doubleday. She had a long career working as an author; she published 35 books including children's fiction  and nonfiction works on archaeology, history, mythology and paranormal studies. She also wrote about folklore and the occult.

She was nominated for a National Book Award for The Beasts of Never (1988) and she wrote many reviews for The New York Times Book Review.

McHargue eventually moved to Groton, Massachusetts where she edited reports on archaeology and history for the Michael's Institute for Conservation Archaeology at Harvard's Peabody Museum and for their historic preservation company Timelines Inc. Her book Facts, Frauds, and Phantasms: A Survey of the Spiritualist Movement (1972) was a skeptical study of spiritualism. The book exposed fraudulent mediums and was described in one review as a "well researched and intriguing case study in human gullibility."

Published books

Fiction 

 Elidor and the Golden Ball (Dodd, Mead & Company, 1973)
 Private Zoo (Viking, 1975)
 Stoneflight (Viking, 1975)
 Funny Bananas: The Mystery in the Museum (Holt, 1975)
 The Talking Table Mystery (Doubleday, 1977)
 The Horseman's Word (Delacorte, 1981)
 The Turquoise Toad Mystery (Delacorte, 1982)
 See You Later, Crocodile (Delacorte, 1988)

Nonfiction

 The Beasts of Never: A History Natural & Un-natural of Monsters Mythical & Magical (Bobbs-Merrill, 1968) – 112 pages, 
 Facts, Frauds, and Phantasms: A Survey of the Spiritualist Movement (Doubleday, 1972)
 The Impossible People: A History Natural and Unnatural of Beings Terrible and Wonderful (Holt, Rinehart and Winston, 1972)
 Mummies (Lippincott, 1972)
 The Beasts of Never (Delacorte, 1988) – revised and expanded edition, x+118 pp, 
 A Field Guide to Conservation Archaeology in North America (1977)

References

External links
Books by Georgess McHargue (latest 2006) at UUGroton.org
 

1941 births
2011 deaths
20th-century American poets
20th-century American women writers
21st-century American women
American children's writers
American editors
American skeptics
American women children's writers
American women poets
Critics of Spiritualism
Writers from New York City